Encopresis is voluntary or involuntary passage of feces outside of toilet-trained contexts (fecal soiling) in children who are four years or older and after an organic cause has been excluded. Children with encopresis often leak stool into their undergarments.

This term is usually applied to children, and where the symptom is present in adults, it is more commonly known as fecal incontinence (including fecal soiling, fecal leakage or fecal seepage).

Signs and symptoms
 (In)voluntary soiling of undergarments. There are two types: with or without constipation. Those with constipation may experience decreased appetite, abdominal pain, have pain on defecation, have fewer bowel movements, and have hard or soft stools. Those without constipation do not have these symptoms.

Causes

Encopresis is commonly caused by constipation, by reflexive withholding of stool, by various physiological, psychological, or neurological disorders, or from surgery (a somewhat rare occurrence).

The colon normally removes excess water from feces. If the feces or stool remains in the colon too long due to conditioned withholding or incidental constipation, so much water is removed that the stool becomes hard, and becomes painful for the child to expel in an ordinary bowel movement. A vicious cycle can develop, where the child may avoid moving his/her bowels in order to avoid the "expected" painful toilet episode. This cycle can result in so deeply conditioning the holding response that the rectal anal inhibitory response (RAIR) or anismus results. The RAIR has been shown to occur even under anesthesia and when voluntary control is lost. The hardened stool continues to build up and stretches the colon or rectum to the point where the normal sensations associated with impending bowel movements do not occur. Eventually, softer stool leaks around the blockage and cannot be withheld by the anus, resulting in soiling. The child typically has no control over these leakage accidents, and may not be able to feel that they have occurred or are about to occur due to the loss of sensation in the rectum and the RAIR. Strong emotional reactions typically result from failed and repeated attempts to control this highly aversive bodily product. These reactions then in turn may complicate conventional treatments using stool softeners, sitting demands, and behavioral strategies.

The onset of encopresis is most often benign. The usual onset is associated with toilet training, demands that the child sit for long periods of time, and intense negative parental reactions to feces. Beginning school or preschool is another major environmental trigger with shared bathrooms. Feuding parents, siblings, moving, and divorce can also inhibit toileting behaviors and promote constipation. An initiating cause may become less relevant as chronic stimuli predominate.

Diagnosis

The psychiatric (DSM-IV) diagnostic criteria for encopresis are:
 Repeated passage of feces into inappropriate places (e.g., underwear or floor) whether voluntary or unintentional
 At least one such event a month for at least 3 months
 Chronological age of at least 4 years (or equivalent developmental level)
 The behavior is not exclusively due to a physiological effect of a substance (e.g., laxatives) or a general medical condition, except through a mechanism involving constipation.

The DSM-IV recognizes two subtypes: with constipation and overflow incontinence, and without constipation and overflow incontinence. In the subtype with constipation, the feces are usually poorly formed and leakage is continuous, and this occurs both during sleep and waking hours. In the type without constipation, the feces are usually well-formed, soiling is intermittent, and feces are usually deposited in a prominent location. This form may be associated with oppositional defiant disorder (ODD) or conduct disorder, or may be the consequence of large anal insertions, or more likely due to chronic encopresis that has radically desensitized the colon and anus.

Treatment
Many pediatricians will recommend the following three-pronged approach to the treatment of encopresis associated with constipation:
 Cleaning out
 Using stool-softening agents
 Scheduled sitting times, typically after meals

The initial clean-out is achieved with enemas, laxatives, or both. The predominant approach today is the use of oral stool softeners like Movicol, Miralax, lactulose, mineral oil, etc. Following that, enemas and laxatives are used daily to keep the stools soft and allow the stretched bowel to return to its normal size.

The child must be taught to use the toilet regularly to retrain his/her body. It is usually recommended that a child be required to sit on the toilet at a regular time each day and 'try' to go for 10–15 minutes (timed toileting), usually soon (or immediately) after eating. Children are more likely to be able to expel a bowel movement right after eating (due to the gastrocolic reflex). It is thought that creating a regular schedule of bathroom time will allow the child to achieve a proper elimination pattern. Repeated voiding success on the toilet itself helps it become a releasor stimulus for successful bowel movements.

Alternatively, when this method fails for six months or longer, a more aggressive approach may be undertaken using suppositories and enemas in a carefully programmed way to overcome the reflexive holding response and to allow the proper voiding reflex to take over. Failure to establish a normal bowel habit can result in permanent stretching of the colon. Certainly, allowing this problem to continue for years with constant assurances that the child "will grow out of it" should be avoided.

Dietary changes are an important management element. Recommended changes to the diet in the case of constipation-caused encopresis include:
 Reduction in the intake of constipating foods such as dairy, peanuts, cooked carrots, and bananas
 Increase in high-fiber foods such as bran, whole wheat products, fruits, and vegetables
 Higher intake of water and liquids, such as juices, although an increased risk of tooth decay has been attributed to excess intake of sweetened juices
 Limit drinks with caffeine, including cola drinks and tea
 Provide well-balanced meals and snacks, and limit fast foods/junk foods that are high in fats and sugars
 Limit whole milk to 500 mL (16.9 ounces) a day for the child over 2 years of age, but do not eliminate milk because children need calcium for bone growth and strength.

The standard behavioral treatment for functional encopresis, which has been shown to be highly effective, is a motivational system such as a contingency management system. In addition to this basic component, seven or eight other behavioral treatment components can be added to increase effectiveness.

Epidemiology 

The estimated prevalence of encopresis in four-year-olds is between one and three percent. The disorder is thought to be more common in males than females, by a factor of 6 to 1.

References

External links

Mental disorders diagnosed in childhood
Symptoms and signs: Digestive system and abdomen
Constipation